Volthe is a hamlet in the Dutch province of Overijssel. It is a part of the municipality of Dinkelland, and lies about 6 km north of Oldenzaal.

Volthe is not a statistical entity, and the postal authorities have placed it under Rossum. It was first mentioned in the late-10th century as Uuluht. The etymology is unclear. In 1840, it was home to 542. Nowadays, it consists of about 200 houses.

It is a rural area with spread out farms and houses, some of them in the timber framed style of the traditional Low German house. 

A fortified house, het Everlo, serves as a starting point for walks to the nearby nature reserve .

Gallery

References

Populated places in Overijssel
Dinkelland